Dalabhya is a sage mentioned in the Chandogya Upanishad. His lineage is the Dalabhya gotra. The Chandogya Upanishad describes a conversation between sages Shilak, Dalabhya and Pravahana. The sage is also mentioned in the  Bhavisya-uttara Purana where the sage Pulastya narrates him the story of Krishna taking the form of a mendicant.

References

Characters in Hindu mythology